There have been many Adelaide and South Australian icons, some of which still exist, but few of which are still South Australian owned.

With the start of the 21st century, and in conjunction with the National Trust (SA), BankSA launched its annual "Heritage Icons List", naming 8 icons per year. The following is a list of some of these and other icons.

List 
Container Deposit Legislation (1996)
AMSCOL (Adelaide Milk Supply Co-Operative Limited), particularly AMSCOL Vanilla Ice-cream and free school milk in 1/3 pint bottles (~190ml)
Dandy - a serving of Amscol vanilla ice-cream packaged in a small (perhaps ) waxed-cardboard tub, sealed with an inserted cardboard cover (with lifting tab), and supplied with a thin flat wooden spoon, marketed from 1928, or earlier, to the takeover of the company.
Balfours - owned by San Remo Macaroni Company since 2008
 Balfours Frog cakes
The Beachouse family entertainment complex, located in Glenelg, South Australia
Bickford's lime juice cordial
The Christmas Pageant
Coopers, particularly Coopers Sparkling Ale and Coopers Pale Ale, still run and tightly held by the 5th generation descendants of the founder
Farmers Union, particularly Farmers Union Iced Coffee, owned since the 1991 by National Foods, now a subsidiary of Kirin
Golden North, particularly Golden North honeycomb ice cream, once again South Australian owned
Haigh's Chocolates
Hall's, (Geo. Hall & Sons), particularly "Passiona" and "Stonie" ginger beer (non-alcoholic)
Draft "Stonie" was available at the Norwood Pie Cart
Hills Hoist
Holden - Adelaide was the site of Holden Vehicle Operations in Elizabeth. They built iconic vehicles such as the Holden Commodore and the Holden Torana.
Kitchener buns
Menz, merged into Arnott, Motterham, Menz in the 1960s, now Privately owned by Robern Menz.
Menz "Yo-Yo" biscuits
Menz FruChocs
Popeye
Pie floaters and Pie carts
South Australian Brewing Company, purchased by Lion Nathan, now a subsidiary of Kirin
West End, West End Draught and Southwark Bitter.
The Brewery Chimney at Thebarton
The Christmas display on the south bank of the River Torrens at Thebarton.
Stobie poles - still South Australian
Tonsley - The suburb where Chrysler Australia and Mitsubishi Motors Australia made cars from 1964 til 2008. The site has been turned into an innovation park and a housing development.
Vili's, particularly Vili's Pies and "Cafe De Vili's" - still South Australian
Woodroofe's, (W Woodroofe & Sons), particularly "Woodies Lemonade", publicly listed in 1983, purchased by SA Brewing Co, and onsold to Cadbury, Fry, Schweppes. Cadbury was acquired by Kraft Foods in 2010; Schweppes Australia is now owned by Asahi (2009)
"Woodies Lemonade, the best lemonade made" is still produced in Adelaide

Gallery

See also
 South Australia

References

Culture of South Australia